Andoquero (Miranya, Miraña-Carapana-tapuyo) is an extinct Witotoan language of Colombia.

References 

Witotoan languages
Extinct languages of South America
Languages of Colombia